The Minister of Finance (or simply, Finance Minister) is the head of the Ministry of Finance of the Government of Malaysia. One of the senior posts in the Cabinet of Malaysia, the finance minister is responsible for determining the fiscal policy and managing national budget of the government.

The Minister of Finance is Anwar Ibrahim since December 3, 2022. He previously served as Finance Minister from 1991 to 1998. 

The minister is supported by the two Deputy Ministers of Finance.

List of the Ministers of Finance
The following individuals have been appointed as Minister of Finance, or any of its precedent titles:

Political Party:

References

 
Ministry of Finance (Malaysia)
Lists of government ministers of Malaysia